Harish Chandra Durgapal(Hindi: हरीश चंद्र दुर्गापाल) is a very popular political leader in Uttarakhand, India. He is former cabinet minister of Labour, Employment, Small Scale Industries, Khadi & Village Industries and Dairy Development in the previous Indian National Congress Government. He was elected MLA from Lalkuan, Nainital, Uttarakhand, India in the 2012 Assembly election as an independent candidate.

Education
Durgapal was educated at U.P. Board Allahabad.

Political career
He won the 2012 Assembly election as an independent candidate from Lalkuan constituency. Before this win, he was a candidate for the Indian National Congress from Dhari (Nainital) constituency in the 2007 election.

While addressing a convention in Haridwar in 2012, Durgapal said that industrialization was important for job creation. He is also working for Infrastructure at Khadi board  in state.

References

External links
 Uttarakhand Government
Official Website of HC Durgapal

Living people
Uttarakhand MLAs 2012–2017
People from Nainital district
Indian National Congress politicians
Uttarakhand politicians
Members of the Uttarakhand Legislative Assembly
Year of birth missing (living people)